Punta Patiño is a nature reserve area in Panama. The 65,025 acre preserve is owned by conservation group ANCON. The area is on the List of Ramsar wetlands of international importance.

Fauna in the reserve include harpy eagles, three-toed sloths, capybaras, bottlenose dolphins, crocodiles, jaguar, and humpback whales. Bird species include black oropendola, brown pelicans, frigate birds, terns, oystercatchers, willet, whimbrel, and spotted sandpiper, kingfishers, white ibis, heron, and laughing gulls.

See also

Protected areas of Panama

References

Protected areas of Panama
Ramsar sites in Panama